Richard Wilson (December 25, 1915 – August 21, 1991) was an American director, actor, writer and producer closely associated with Orson Welles and the Mercury Theatre.

Select filmography
Man with the Gun (1955) - director
The Big Boodle (1957) - director
Raw Wind in Eden (1958) - director
Al Capone (1959) - director
Pay or Die (1960) - director, producer
Invitation to a Gunfighter (1964) - director, producer
Three in the Attic (1968) - director, producer
It's All True: Based on an Unfinished Film by Orson Welles (1993) - producer

References

External links

 

 Finding Aid for the Richard Wilson – Orson Welles Papers 1930–2000 (bulk 1930–1991), Special Collections Library, University of Michigan

1915 births
1991 deaths
American male radio actors
American film producers
Film directors from Pennsylvania
Male actors from Pennsylvania
20th-century American businesspeople